Ditrachyptera is a monotypic snout moth genus described by Émile Louis Ragonot in 1893. Its only species, Ditrachyptera verruciferella, described by the same author in 1888, is found in South Africa, the Gambia and the United Arab Emirates.

References

Phycitinae
Monotypic moth genera
Fauna of the Gambia
Moths of Africa
Taxa named by Émile Louis Ragonot
Pyralidae genera